WWNC (570 kHz) is a commercial AM radio station in Asheville, North Carolina. It broadcasts a Talk radio format and is owned by iHeartMedia, Inc.  The studios and transmitter are on Summerlin Road in Ashville.

WWNC is powered at 5,000 watts.  By day, it is non-directional.  But at night, to protect other stations on 570 AM from interference, it uses a directional antenna with a four-tower array.

Programming
Weekdays begin with a local information and interview program, "First News with Mark Starling."  Much of the rest of schedule is nationally syndicated shows, largely from co-owned Premiere Networks:  "The Glenn Beck Program," "The Clay Travis and Buck Sexton Show," "The Sean Hannity Show," "The Ramsey Show with Dave Ramsey," "Coast to Coast AM with George Noory" and "This Morning, America's First News with Gordon Deal."

Weekends feature specialty shows on money, health, real estate, travel, home repair, technology and the law.  Weekend syndicated shows include "The Kim Komando Show", "At Home with Gary Sullivan," "Bill Handel on the Law," "The Weekend with Michael Brown," "Sunday Night Live with Bill Cunningham" and "Somewhere in Time with Art Bell."  Most hours begin with an update from Fox News Radio.

History

Early years
It was Asheville's first radio station and among the oldest in North Carolina. The studios were at the Vanderbilt Hotel. Other broadcast locations have included the Flatiron Building and the Citizen-Times Building when it was owned by the daily newspaper. For most of its early years, WWNC was powered at 1,000 watts. The call sign refers to the broadcasting region of Western North Carolina.

In its early days, WWNC, started by the Asheville Chamber of Commerce, provided weather and road reports, and music at night.  Country legend Jimmie Rodgers was among the stars who performed on the station.  On October 10, 1931, WWNC changed its affiliation from CBS Radio to the NBC Red Network.  WWNC carried NBC's schedule of dramas, comedies, news, sports, soap operas, game shows and big band broadcasts during the "Golden Age of Radio."

Popular shows
On September 10, 1936, President Franklin Roosevelt spoke at McCormick Field. WWNC broadcast the speech.  The station was the Western North Carolina home to Amos and Andy, Fibber McGee and Molly and Jack Benny. In 1938, WWNC was one of the many stations broadcasting Orson Welles' The War of the Worlds.

The first time the world heard Bill Monroe and the Blue Grass Boys was February 2, 1939, at 3:30 pm when the group played a fifteen-minute segment on Mountain Music Time. At the time, WWNC was an NBC affiliate, owned by the Asheville Citizen-Times. Bill Monroe and the Blue Grass Boys played the daily 3:30-3:45 Mountain Music spot until April 1, 1939.

MOR and Country
As network programming moved from radio to television, WWNC switched to a full service, middle of the road (MOR) format, including popular adult music, news and sports.  In 1969, WWNC switched from MOR to country music.

In the days before FM became popular, WWNC was sometimes the highest-rated station in the United States with an Arbitron share over 40 percent, occasionally as high as 50 percent for morning drive time disc jockey Scotty Rhodarmer. It was the top station in the Asheville radio market for many years.  In 2000, it was acquired by Capstar, which was in turn acquired by Clear Channel Communications, a forerunner of today's iHeartMedia.

Talk Radio
In 2002, WWNC changed its format from country music (except for the Scotty Rhodarmer morning show) to all-talk, taking over talk shows previously heard on WTZY (now WPEK). In 2004, Rhodarmer retired as WWNC morning host after more than 40 years in the position and 50 years as a station employee. In 1979, he had 56 percent of the audience according to Arbitron, more than any other local radio personality. His theme song was "Carolina in the Morning".  On June 18, 2010, many of the former DJs had a reunion. They included Rhodarmer, Frank Byrd, Wiley Carpenter, John Roten, John Anderson and Randy Houston.

Western Carolina University broadcast a program in December 2010 on WWNC recreating Welles' 1938 broadcast of A Christmas Carol, including Arthur Anderson, who at age 16 performed with Welles in the original broadcast.

On January 23, 2012, Pete Kaliner, who worked at WBT in Charlotte, North Carolina, from 1999 to 2011, took the afternoon slot. Sean Hannity moved from 3 p.m. back to 6 p.m., where his show had been since Matt Mittan left the station. Kaliner said his show would feature "a wide-ranging discussion of all things in Western North Carolina".

References

External links
WWNC official website

WNC
News and talk radio stations in the United States
IHeartMedia radio stations
Radio stations established in 1927